The 1994 ITU Triathlon World Championships were held in Wellington, New Zealand on 27 November 1994 and organised by the International Triathlon Union. The course was a  swim,  bike,  run.

Results

Men's Championship

Women's Championship

See also
1994 ITU Triathlon World Cup

References

World Triathlon Series
World Championships
1994 in New Zealand sport
International sports competitions hosted by New Zealand
Triathlon competitions in New Zealand